Alice Peta Richardson (born 14 May 1986) is an English rugby union player. She represented  at the 2010 Women's Rugby World Cup. She captained the English sevens team to the 2013 Rugby World Cup Sevens. Richardson captained the sevens team earlier that year at the 2013 USA Women's Sevens for the 2012–13 IRB Women's Sevens World Series.

References

External links
 

1986 births
Living people
Rugby union players from Birmingham, West Midlands
England women's international rugby union players
English female rugby union players
Rugby sevens players at the 2016 Summer Olympics
Olympic rugby sevens players of Great Britain
Great Britain national rugby sevens team players
England international women's rugby sevens players